The 2013 Memorial Cup was a four-team, round-robin format ice hockey tournament played from May 17–26, 2013. It was the 95th Memorial Cup championship and determined the champion of the Canadian Hockey League (CHL).  The tournament featured the London Knights, champions of the Ontario Hockey League, the Halifax Mooseheads, champions of the Quebec Major Junior Hockey League, the Portland Winterhawks, champions of the Western Hockey League, and the Saskatoon Blades, who won the right to host the tournament over bids by the Kelowna Rockets and the Red Deer Rebels. This was the first Memorial Cup to be held in Saskatoon since the Blades hosted it in 1989. The Halifax Mooseheads won the Memorial Cup for the first time in franchise history, beating the Portland Winterhawks 6–4 in the final. The Halifax Mooseheads joined the Saint John Sea Dogs in 2011, and the Shawinigan Cataractes in 2012, as the third straight team from the QMJHL to capture the trophy.

Round-robin standings

For the second time since the current tournament format was established in 1983, the teams each split their first two games. At the conclusion of the round-robin, the tiebreaker between the first and second team as well as between the third and fourth placed team were decided by head-to-head records.

Schedule
All times local (UTC −6)

Round robin

Playoff round

Tie-Breaker

Semi-final

Final

Statistical leaders

Skaters

GP = Games played; G = Goals; A = Assists; Pts = Points; PIM = Penalty minutes

Goaltending

This is a combined table of the top goaltenders based on goals against average and save percentage with at least sixty minutes played. The table is sorted by GAA.

GP = Games played; W = Wins; L = Losses; SA = Shots against; GA = Goals against; GAA = Goals against average; SV% = Save percentage; SO = Shutouts; TOI = Time on ice (minutes:seconds)

Awards
Stafford Smythe Memorial Trophy (MVP): Nathan MacKinnon (Halifax Mooseheads)
Ed Chynoweth Trophy (Leading Scorer): Nathan MacKinnon (Halifax Mooseheads)
George Parsons Trophy (Sportsmanlike): Bo Horvat (London Knights)
Hap Emms Memorial Trophy (Top Goalie): Andrey Makarov (Saskatoon Blades)
All-Star Team:
Goaltender: Zach Fucale (Halifax Mooseheads)
Defence: Konrad Abeltshauser (Halifax Mooseheads), Derrick Pouliot (Portland Winterhawks)
Forwards: Martin Frk (Halifax Mooseheads), Nathan MacKinnon (Halifax Mooseheads), Ty Rattie (Portland Winterhawks)

Team rosters

Saskatoon Blades (Host)
Head coach: Lorne Molleken

Portland Winterhawks (WHL)
Head coach: Travis Green

London Knights (OHL)

Head coach: Dale Hunter

Halifax Mooseheads (QMJHL)

Head coach: Dominique Ducharme

Road to the Cup

WHL Playoffs

OHL Playoffs

QMJHL Playoffs

References

External links
 Memorial Cup
 Canadian Hockey League

Memorial Cup tournaments
Memorial Cup
Memorial Cup
Ice hockey competitions in Saskatchewan
Memorial Cup